Exoletuncus is a genus of moths belonging to the family Tortricidae.

Species
Exoletuncus angulatus Razowski & Pelz, 2005
Exoletuncus aquilus Razowski & Pelz, 2005
Exoletuncus artifex Razowski, 1997
Exoletuncus atalodes (Meyrick, 1917)
Exoletuncus canescens Razowski & Pelz, 2005
Exoletuncus consertus Razowski, 1997
Exoletuncus cretatus Razowski, 1997
Exoletuncus exoristus Razowski, 1988
Exoletuncus guacamayosensis Razowski & Pelz, 2005
Exoletuncus lobopus Razowski & Becker, 2002
Exoletuncus multimaculatus Razowski & Becker, 2002
Exoletuncus musivus Razowski, 1997
Exoletuncus nivesanus Razowski, 1999
Exoletuncus paraquilus Razowski & Pelz, 2005
Exoletuncus pleregraptus Razowski & Pelz, 2005
Exoletuncus similis Razowski & Pelz, 2005
Exoletuncus trilobopa (Meyrick, 1926)
Exoletuncus unguiculus Razowski & Wojtusiak, 2010

See also
List of Tortricidae genera

References

 , 1988, Acta zoologica cracoviensia 31: 390
 , 2005, World Catalogue of Insects 5
 , 2002: Black and white forewing pattern in Tortricidae (Lepidoptera), with descriptions of new taxa of Neotropical Euliini. Acta zoologica cracoviensia 45 (3): 245–257. Full article:  
 , 2010: Tortricidae (Lepidoptera) from Peru. Acta Zoologica Cracoviensia 53B (1-2): 73–159. . Full article:  .

External links
tortricidae.com

Euliini
Tortricidae genera